The 2015–16 NAGICO Super50 was the 42nd edition of the Regional Super50, the domestic limited-overs cricket competition for the countries of the West Indies Cricket Board (WICB). The tournament was co-hosted by Saint Kitts and Trinidad and Tobago, with the final held at Queen's Park Oval, Port of Spain.

Eight teams participated in the competition – the six regular teams of West Indian domestic cricket (Barbados, Guyana, Jamaica, the Leeward Islands, Trinidad and Tobago, and the Windward Islands), plus two development teams (Combined Campuses and Colleges and ICC Americas). The ICC Americas team, featuring players from countries outside the scope of the WICB, was competing for the first time. Trinidad and Tobago eventually defeated Barbados in the final, winning their twelfth domestic one-day title.

On 15 January, umpire Jacqueline Williams stood in the match between Trinidad & Tobago and ICC Americas, becoming the first female umpire to stand in the domestic 50-over competition in the West Indies.

Squads

Group stage

Group A

Group B

Knockout stage

Semi-finals

Final

Statistics

Most runs
The top five run-scorers are included in this table, listed by runs scored and then by batting average.

Most wickets

The top five wicket-takers are listed in this table, listed by wickets taken and then by bowling average.

References

External links
 Series home at ESPN Crincfo

2016 in West Indian cricket
Regional Super50
Regional Super50 seasons
2015–16 West Indian cricket season